The Seoul ePrix is an annual race of the single-seater, electrically powered Formula E championship, to be held at the Seoul Street Circuit in Seoul, the capital of South Korea. It was first raced in the 2021–2022 season as the first ePrix in South Korea and fifth Asian country to host an ePrix, following China (including Hong Kong), Malaysia, Saudi Arabia, and Indonesia.

It is the first time in nine years that South Korea has hosted large motorsports events since the last Formula One Korean Grand Prix held in 2013.

History 
South Korea's previous attempts at hosting motorsport events include the Korean Grand Prix situated at Yeongam, which ran from 2010 to 2013. Low attendance figures, five hours of traveling time from Seoul and unfulfilled resort facilities around the track were the main reasons for the event's short existence.

On 30 November 2018, Formula E CEO, Alejandro Agag signed an agreement with Moon Jae-sik, chairman of JSM Holdings. South Korea was given the right to hold the ABB Formula E Championship from 2020 to 2025. The aim is to expand the Asian market and provide a platform for cooperation between Formula E and South Korean automobile industrial technology and eco-friendly innovations.

The Formula E race will be served as an annual attraction for motor sport fans from nearby countries such as China and Japan.

Three other candidates in the Asia-Pacific region considered for hosting included Australia, Russia, and New Zealand.

The inaugural Seoul ePrix was cancelled in response to the COVID-19 pandemic, then it was due to take place on 23 May 2021 as the 9th round of the 2021 Formula E season. But due to the ongoing situation of the COVID-19 pandemic, the race's first running will be on the 2022 Formula E season. On 19 June 2021, Seoul city government announced that the race's first running would be set to form part of the Seoul Fest celebrations on the days of 13–14 August 2022

The Seoul ePrix was set to return for the 2022-23 Formula E season on 20 and 21 May 2023, but renovation works to the Jamsil Stadium meant that the event would not be able to take place, and it was replaced by the Cape Town ePrix.

Results

References 

Seoul
International sports competitions hosted by South Korea
Motorsport in South Korea
Recurring sporting events established in 2022
2022 establishments in Asia